1937 Academy Awards may refer to:

 9th Academy Awards, the Academy Awards ceremony that took place in 1937
 10th Academy Awards, the 1938 ceremony honoring the best in film for 1937